William Thomas Walsh (born 3 July 1963) is an Irish former boxer who is currently the Head Coach of USA Boxing. Raised in Wexford he competed in the men's welterweight event at the 1988 Summer Olympics.

Appointed Head coach of the Irish High Performance Boxing programme in 2003 Walsh was at the helm of Irish boxing at the 2008 Summer Olympics and 2012 Summer Olympics, guiding them to seven medals, bookmarked by Katie Taylor's gold in London. He was headhunted by the Americans after the U.S. men went home without a medal for the first time in Games history 

In 2016 Walsh was awarded the International Boxing Association (amateur) Coach of the Year.

References

External links
 

1963 births
Living people
Irish male boxers
Olympic boxers of Ireland
Boxers at the 1988 Summer Olympics
Boxers from Manchester
Welterweight boxers
Irish expatriate sportspeople in the United States